Acropoma is a genus of fish in the family Acropomatidae, the temperate ocean-basses or lanternbellies. They are native to the Indian Ocean and western Pacific Ocean. They are characterized by a ventral luminous organ that has a luminous gland, a lens, and a reflector. The shape of the luminous organ helps distinguish the species in the genus.

Species
The following species are currently recognised as being members of this genus:
 Acropoma arafurensis Okamoto , J.T. Williams, K.E. Carpenter, Santos & S, Kimura, 2019 
 Acropoma argentistigma Okamoto & H. Ida, 2002
 Acropoma boholensis Yamanoue & Matsuura, 2002
 Acropoma hanedai Matsubara, 1953
 Acropoma heemstrai Okamoto and Golani, 2017
 Acropoma japonicum Günther, 1859 (Glowbelly)
 Acropoma lecorneti Fourmanoir, 1988
 Acropoma leobergi Prokofiev, 2018
 Acropoma profundum Okamoto, 2014 (Solomon's lanternbelly) 
 Acropoma splendens (Lloyd, 1909)

References